Cossulus mucosus is a moth in the family Cossidae. It is found in south-eastern Kazakhstan, southern Kyrgyzstan, Tajikistan, Turkmenistan, Iran and Afghanistan.

References

Natural History Museum Lepidoptera generic names catalog

Moths described in 1884
Cossinae
Moths of Asia